Centurione II Zaccaria (died 1432), scion of a powerful Genoese merchant family established in the Morea, was installed as Prince of Achaea by Ladislaus of Naples in 1404 and was the last ruler of the Latin Empire not under Byzantine suzerainty. 

Centurione was the son of Andronikos Asen Zaccaria and grandson of Centurione I Zaccaria. He succeeded his father in the barony of Arkadia (modern Kyparissia) in 1402. Though young, he was ambitious and he overthrew his aunt, Maria II Zaccaria, in Achaea in 1404; a move which was approved by his overlord, the king of Naples. Immediately, he reinforced his power on a local basis by marrying Creusa, the daughter of Leonardo II Tocco, lord of Zante and niece of Carlo I Tocco whose dominions covered Cephalonia and Lefkada and extended to Epirus and the western Peloponnese. Centurione then made his brother Stephen the Latin Archbishop of Patras. 

However, Centurione was quickly at war with his alienated relatives. His wife's cousin Carlo I Tocco, duke of Leucas, had Ladislaus absolve him from his feudal obligations to Achaea (1406) and then, allied with Theodore I Palaiologos, Despot of Morea, made war on the principality, conquering Glarentza (1408), long the principality's chief seaport. His brother Stephen, however, abandoned the diocese of Patras to the Venetians on loan for five years. Centurione himself was forced to ally with the Venetians and Justinian, Lord of Chios, and to hire Albanian mercenaries to retake the port on 12 July 1414. In return for military protection, he granted the ports of Glarentza and Navarino to the Giustiniani family of Genoa. 

Thereafter, for three years, Centurione could obtain no help from Genoa, pressed by the Duke of Milan on land and by the Crown of Aragon at sea. In 1417, the imperial army of Constantinople, led by the despot Theodore II Palaeologus and Emperor John VIII, invaded Achaea. They took Messenia and Elis and holed up Centurione in Glarentza, from which he fled by sea in the spring of 1418. A little later, Patras too fell. Only by the mediation of the Venetians occupying Navarino was the prince able to secure a truce. 

All that was left of the principality that once dominated Greece were a few fortresses, such as the ancestral castle and barony of Chalandritsa. In 1429, Thomas Palaeologus of the Morea besieged Centurione in Chalandritsa and extracted a treaty from him whereby his daughter, Catherine, would marry the despot and thus make him Centurione's heir in Achaea. Centurione was allowed to keep his inheritance, the barony of Arcadia (not to be confused with the region of the same name). Centurione retired to Arcadia in 1430, after the marriage was finalised. He died there two years later. His domains passed to the despotate of Morea and into Byzantine hands.

Centurione left one illegitimate son, John Asen Zaccaria, who was the centre of later revolts against Greek authority.

See also 

 Zaccaria
 Centurione I Zaccaria
 Benedetto I Zaccaria
 Republic of Genoa

References

Sources

External links 
Storia dell’isola di Scio prima dei Giustiniani e principali vicende della famiglia Zaccaria. (in Italian)

14th-century births
Zaccaria
Princes of Achaea
Barons of the Principality of Achaea
Centurione 02
Asen dynasty
Barons of Vostitsa
Barons of Arcadia
15th-century people from the Principality of Achaea